Minutoexcipula is a genus of lichenicolous (lichen-dwelling) fungi of uncertain familial placement in the order Chaetothyriales. It has eight species. The genus was circumscribed in 1994 by M. Violeta Atienza Tamarit and David Leslie Hawksworth, with Minutoexcipula tuckerae assigned as the type species. The genus is characterized both by its black convex -like , as well as the well-differentiated  on these structures.

Species
 Minutoexcipula beaglei  – host: Lecanora spp.
 Minutoexcipula calatayudii  – host: Hypogymnia tubulosa
 Minutoexcipula kovalenkoi  – Lecanora pulicaris
 Minutoexcipula mariana  – Pertusaria heterochroa
 Minutoexcipula miniatoexcipula  – host: Pertusaria epixantha
 Minutoexcipula tephromelae  – host: Tephromela atra
 Minutoexcipula tuckerae  – host: Pertusaria texana
 Minutoexcipula tuerkii  – host: Pertusaria glomerata

References

Eurotiomycetes
Eurotiomycetes genera
Taxa described in 1994
Lichenicolous fungi
Taxa named by David Leslie Hawksworth